Nadezhda Konstantinovna Markina (born 29 January 1959) is a Soviet and Russian actress. She was nominated for the Best Performance by an Actress at the European Film Awards, the Asia Pacific Screen Awards, and the IFFI Best Actor Award (Female): Silver Peacock Award at the 42nd International Film Festival of India for the film Elena (2011).

Selected filmography
 How Dark the Nights Are on the Black Sea as Sonya (1989)
 The Wedding as Valka (2000)
 Moscow Saga as episode (2004)
 The Sword Bearer  as Sasha's mother (2006)
 Elena as Elena (2011) 
 In the Fog as Burov's mother (2012)
 Gagarin: First in Space as    Yuri's mother (2013)
 Ottepel as Olga Filippovna (2013)
 The White Crow as bureaucrat (2018)
 White Snow as Militsa (2020)

References

External links

1959 births
Living people
People from Tambov Oblast
Soviet film actresses
Soviet stage actresses
Russian film actresses
IFFI Best Actor (Female) winners
Asia Pacific Screen Award winners
Russian television actresses
Russian stage actresses
21st-century Russian actresses
Recipients of the Nika Award
20th-century Russian actresses